Events in the year 2020 in Suriname.

Incumbents 
 

 President: Dési Bouterse (until 16 July); Chan Santokhi (from 16 July)
 Vice President: Ashwin Adhin (until 16 July); Ronnie Brunswijk (from 16 July)
 Speaker: Jennifer Simons (until 28 June); Ronnie Brunswijk (from 29 June to 14 July); Marinus Bee (from 14 July)

Events 

25 May – 2020 Surinamese general election
16 July – Chan Santokhi takes over as president.

Deaths

3 April – Hans Prade, diplomat, (b. 1938).
10 April – Bas Mulder, priest (b. 1931).
12 April – Kishen Bholasing, singer (b. 1984).
22 April – Rinaldo Entingh, footballer and entrepreneur (b. 1955/1956).
7 May – Emile Wijntuin, politician (b. 1924).
11 May – Ietje Paalman-de Miranda, Surinamese born Dutch mathematician (b. 1936).
18 June – Jules Sedney, economist and politician (b. 1922).
18 August – Soeki Irodikromo, 75, Surinamese painter.

References

 
2020s in Suriname
Years of the 21st century in Suriname
Suriname
Suriname